Raintree County is a 1957 American epic historical romance western film adapted from the 1948 novel of the same name by Ross Lockridge Jr. The film was directed by Edward Dmytryk and distributed by Metro-Goldwyn-Mayer. Set in the American South against the backdrop of the Antebellum South and the American Civil War, the film tells the story of a small-town Midwestern teacher and poet named John Shawnessy, who meets and marries a beautiful Southern belle named Susanna Drake; however, her emotional instability leads to the destruction of their marriage. The leading roles are played by Montgomery Clift, Elizabeth Taylor, Eva Marie Saint, Nigel Patrick and Lee Marvin.

In July 1947, Metro-Goldwyn-Mayer had purchased the film rights of Ross Lockridge Jr.'s unpublished manuscript for Raintree County for $150,000. Carey Wilson was immediately signed as producer, and prominent actors were considered for leading roles. In January 1948, the book was released and became a national bestseller. In the following year, filming was delayed for two years as the project had grown too expensive. In 1955, the project was revived with Taylor and Clift signed for the two leading roles. Filming began in April 1956 and wrapped in October 1956. It would also mark the first use of a 65-millimeter widescreen process originally called MGM Camera 65.

Raintree County had its world premiere at the Brown Theatre in Louisville, Kentucky on October 2, 1957. In December 1957, the film was given a wide release in the United States, where it received negative reviews from film critics, who praised the production values and the performances of Clift and Taylor, but were critical of the film's plot. The film was nominated for four Academy Awards for Best Actress (Taylor), Art Direction–Set Decoration, Best Costume Design, and Best Score.

Plot
In 1859, idealist John Wickliff Shawnessey (Montgomery Clift) is living in Raintree County, Indiana. He's fascinated by the legend of the county's magnificent raintree, and at one point he ventures into the large, dangerous swamp where he believes it can be found. His quest is unsuccessful, and he almost dies in the effort.

Shawnessey has a high school sweetheart, Nell Gaither (Eva Marie Saint), but he's soon distracted by Susanna Drake (Elizabeth Taylor), a rich New Orleans girl. He has a brief and passionate affair with Susanna while she is visiting his community. Following her return to the South, she comes back to Indiana to tell Shawnessey that she is pregnant with his child. John marries her out of honor and duty, leaving Nell heartbroken.

They travel south to visit Susanna's family. He learns that Susanna's mother went insane and died in a suspicious fire, along with Susanna's father and Henrietta, a slave implied to be the father's concubine. Susanna suspects that Henrietta may have been her biological mother. Gradually Susanna appears to be suffering from mental illness. She tells John that she faked pregnancy to trick him into marriage.

An abolitionist in the South, Shawnessey does not fit in with Susanna's family, and they return to Raintree County before the outbreak of the Civil War. John works as a teacher and they have a child, Jimmy, born at the outbreak of the war. In the war's third year, Susanna develops severe paranoia and delusions. She flees Indiana with Jimmy and seeks refuge among her extended family in Georgia.

Shawnessey is determined to find her and recover his son. He enlists in the Union Army in hopes of encountering his wife and child. After fighting in terrible battles, he finds Jimmy at an old plantation and learns that Susanna has been placed in an insane asylum. He is wounded while carrying Jimmy back to Northern lines, and is discharged from the Union Army. Johnny searches for Susanna, finding her kept in terrible conditions at the asylum. He brings her back with him to Raintree County.

After the end of the war and President Abraham Lincoln's assassination, Shawnessey considers his future. Nell urges him to run for political office. Recognizing that Nell and John still love each other, Susanna sacrifices herself and deludedly enters the swamp in the middle of the night to find the legendary raintree. Four-year-old Jimmy follows her. The search party eventually finds her body. John and Nell find Jimmy alive and carry him out of the swamp. Focused on the child, the two fail to notice the tall, spectacular raintree glowing in the early morning sunlight.

Cast
 Montgomery Clift as John Wickliff Shawnessey
 Elizabeth Taylor as Susanna Drake
 Eva Marie Saint as Nell Gaither
 Nigel Patrick as Prof. Jerusalem Webster Stiles
 Lee Marvin as Orville 'Flash' Perkins
 Rod Taylor as Garwood B. Jones
 Agnes Moorehead as Ellen Shawnessy
 Walter Abel as T.D. Shawnessy 
 Jarma Lewis as Barbara Drake 
 Tom Drake as Bobby Drake 
 Rhys Williams as Ezra Gray 
 Russell Collins as Niles Foster 
 DeForest Kelley as Southern officer

Production

Development
On July 15, 1947, Metro-Goldwyn-Mayer had awarded first-time author Ross Lockridge Jr. a $150,000 prize for his novel, Raintree County, which was to be published by Houghton Mifflin. Two days later, the studio had purchased the film rights for $150,000. With a preliminary budget of $6 million, screenwriter Carey Wilson had been signed as the producer. He stated he had Lana Turner, Ava Gardner, and Janet Leigh in mind for the female roles while Robert Walker and Keenan Wynn were being considered for the leading male roles. On the studio's shortlist, Van Heflin and Gene Kelly were also being considered. Less than a year later, in March 1948, Lockridge Jr. was found dead inside his garage. His death was ruled a suicide from carbon monoxide poisoning. It was also reported that he had been working with the studio on the film adaptation. However, in August 1949, Wilson wrote a letter addressed to Lockridge's widow that the project had been delayed for two years. He wrote, "The book, to be filmed as I want it filmed and as the quality of the writing demands it be filmed, will cost more than $6,000,000 and the situation today does not permit such an expenditure."

In August 1955, the project had been revived by MGM production head executive Dore Schary with David Lewis being hired as producer. Elizabeth Taylor had been cast as Susannah Drake and Millard Kaufman was hired to write the script. In December of the same year, Montgomery Clift had signed a three-picture deal with Metro-Goldwyn-Mayer with Raintree County to be filmed first. By January 1956,  Eva Marie Saint had been offered $100,000 to co-star in Raintree County. Rod Taylor actively campaigned for his role in the film.

Filming
Raintree County was shot at various locations, including Dunleith and Elms Court
antebellum mansions, Windsor Ruins, in Natchez, Mississippi; Reelfoot Lake in northwest Tennessee near the Kentucky border; and two locations in Kentucky, the Liberty Hall Historic Site on Wilkinson Street in Frankfort and settings in and near Danville. The Reelfoot Lake locations were used for the swamp scenes.

During filming, Montgomery Clift was injured and nearly killed in a serious automobile accident. On the evening of May 12, 1956, feeling tired and suffering from a hangover, he drove into a telephone pole and wrecked his car. He broke his nose, cut his lip, and fractured his jaw in three places, which had to be wired back together by surgery. As a result, the studio announced that production had been shut down for two to three weeks. At the time, the filming crew had moved to do two months of location shooting throughout most of the Deep South. A week later, after Clift had been discharged from the hospital, filming was further delayed until early July as the studio believed he (Clift) would be able to return to work within three weeks. Although he spent weeks in surgery and recovery, he returned to finish the film. The physical damage to his face was apparent in several scenes filmed after the accident; the left side of his face was partially paralyzed.  His performance in the scenes shot after the accident was also markedly different from those shot before; he began to drink heavily and take a concoction of drugs which made his face more haggard and gave his eyes a furtive look, and affected his attitude and posture.

Edward Dmytryk later revealed in his autobiography It's a Hell of a Life but Not a Bad Living that he found  "a hundred containers" of every kind of drug and "a beautiful leather case fitted with needles and syringes" in Clift's hotel room and once found him so drunk that his cigarette had burned itself out between his fingers. During filming in Danville, Clift's behavior grew increasingly erratic and bizarre, ordering his steak "blue-rare" (nearly uncooked) and adding masses of butter and pepper and eating it with his fingers, and running naked through the town, which resulted in a policeman being stationed outside his hotel room door to prevent him leaving during the night.

Elizabeth Taylor also had problems during the production with her period clothing, and on one occasion she collapsed from hyperventilation and was treated with Clift's bottle of Demerol and a syringe, delivered by the doctor. She took over a week to also recover from tachycardia following the incident. On set she was often late for filming and preoccupied with her romance with Mike Todd, who hired a commercial airliner to personally deliver some expensive presents to her in Danville.

Raintree County was the first film shot in a 65-millimeter anamorphic widescreen process originally called MGM Camera 65, later renamed Ultra Panavision 70, which yielded an extra-wide image of 2.76:1; it was also used for MGM's 1959 version of Ben Hur. Although MGM expected to release the film in 70mm, the studio ultimately opted not to as the only projectors at the time were being used to screen Mike Todd's Around the World in 80 Days. Due to the major delays in filming due to the issues with Clift and Taylor and the extravagant sets, the film was the most expensive US-based film in MGM's history, and Dmytryk never directed for MGM again. Though a success at the box office, it did not recoup its cost.

Release
On January 24, 1957, Dmytryk, Lewis, Joseph Vogel, and numerous studio executives drove out to Santa Barbara, California to preview the film at the Granada Theater. The film ran for three hours and six minutes, and it had reportedly received a favorable response from an audience of 1,100 spectators. However, by March 1957, following numerous previews, MGM announced that reshoots would begin that same month so "that certain dramatic points will be emphasized by re-shooting in close-up and that extra footage will be added to achieve smoother transitions in the sprawling drama."

About 5,000 attendees arrived in Louisville, Kentucky for the film's world premiere at the Brown Theatre on October 2, 1957. It was the climax of two days of festivities which included a parade of limousines featuring stars from the film, receptions, and a costume ball held at the Freedom Hall Coliseum. The next month, it was reported that fifteen minutes would be cut from the film for its general release. For the film's wide release, Panavision president Robert Gottschalk stated Raintree County would be released in certain theaters on large-format 70mm film prints for roadshow theatrical engagements and on standard 35mm film prints.

Reception

Critical reaction
Bosley Crowther of The New York Times wrote "It has a beautiful, costly production that is projected onto the screen in a sharp photographic process called Camera 65. It has a fancy cast of performers, headed by Elizabeth Taylor, Montgomery Clift, Eva Marie Saint and Nigel Patrick. And it has a busy musical score by Johnny Green. But Millard Kaufman's screenplay is a formless amoeba of a thing, and therein lies the fatal weakness of this costly, ambitious film." Harrison's Reports felt "The picture is, in fact, so verbose that one loses its drift of the story unless he pays close attention to the dialogue. One of the shortcomings in the story is the fact that the motivations of some of the characters, particularly the hero, are not too clear, making for a vagueness that diminishes its dramatic impact...The acting of the entire cast is first-rate, and there are numerous scenes that are most effective dramatically, but on the whole the story falls short of the production's impressive visual beauty." Similarly, Variety described the film as "a big picture in terms of pictorial size but the story doesn't always match the scope of the production. Chief story fault lies in its vagueness—the not truly specified motivations of the principals and in the conflicts involved in Clift's search for happiness alternately with Miss Saint and Miss Taylor."

Among contemporary reviews, Geoff Andrew of Time Out called the film an "elephantine bore". On the review aggregate website Rotten Tomatoes, the film has an approval rating of 10% based on 10 reviews with an average rating of 5.20/10.

Box office
According to MGM records, the film earned $5,830,000 in North America and $3,250,000 internationally. Because of its high cost, the movie recorded a loss of $484,000.

Awards and honors

The film is recognized by American Film Institute in these lists:
 2002: AFI's 100 Years...100 Passions – Nominated
 2005: AFI's 100 Years of Film Scores – Nominated

See also
 List of American films of 1957

References

External links

 
 
 
 

1950s historical drama films
American historical drama films
1957 Western (genre) films
American Western (genre) films
1957 films
Films directed by Edward Dmytryk
Films scored by Johnny Green
Metro-Goldwyn-Mayer films
1950s English-language films
Films set in 1859
American Civil War films
Films shot in Kentucky
Films shot in Mississippi
Danville, Kentucky
Frankfort, Kentucky
Films set in Indiana
Southern Gothic films
1950s American films
Antebellum South